Miss Perú 2010, the 58th Miss Perú pageant was held at the  on May 22, 2010. That year, 22 candidates were competing for the national crown. The chosen winners represented Peru at the Miss Universe 2010 and Miss World 2010. The rest of the finalists would enter in different pageants.

Placements

Special Awards

 Best Regional Costume - Ayacucho - Emma Machado
 Miss Photogenic - Trujillo - Estefani Mauricci
 Miss Elegance - Loreto - Giuliana Zevallos
 Miss Body - Pasco - Sofía Rivera
 Best Hair - Region Lima - Alexandra Liao
 Miss Congeniality - Piura - Nathali Díaz
 Most Beautiful Face - Ucayali - Claudia Villafuerte
 Best Smile - Cajamarca - Karla Chávez
 Miss Internet - Lambayeque - Elizabeth Aedo
 Miss Talent Show - Lambayeque - Elizabeth Aedo

Delegates

Amazonas - Ivvy Zea
Áncash - Jimena Salas
Arequipa - Yanella Aguilar
Ayacucho - Emma Machado
Cajamarca - Karla Chávez
Callao - Gretel Montero
Cuzco - Jasseth Aguinaga
Ica - Pamela Crovetto
Junín - Alexandra Hidalgo
La Libertad - Cinthia Risco
Lambayeque - Elizabeth Aedo

Loreto - Giuliana Zevallos
Madre de Dios - Debby López
Pasco - Sofía Rivera
Piura - Nathali Díaz
Region Lima - Alexandra Liao
San Martín - Gina Grandez
Tacna - Miluzka Lucero
Trujillo - Estefani Mauricci
Tumbes - María Jose Martínez
Ucayali - Claudia Villafuerte

Trivia
 Miss Moquegua, Estefani Carpio, withdrew Miss Peru 2010 pageant, (a few days after the Presentation press Conference) for some disagreements with the national director.

Judges

Dr. Walter Cruzálegui - Plastic Surgeon

Claudia Ortiz de Zevallos - Miss Perú 2003

Dr. Álex Tena - Dental Specialist

Luis Roy - General Manager of Personal Training Gym

Marynes Mendoza- Mrs. Venezuela International 2009

Juan Manuel del Mar - Mayor of Santiago de Surco District

Mariana Larrabure -  Miss World Peru 1998

Desiree Soto - Marketing Manager of Exclusiva

Gracia Adrianzén - General Manager of Carolina Latina

Víctor Hugo Montalvo - General Manager of Montalvo Spa

Heidi Castrillón - Manager of  BIZ USA PERU Magazine

Gian Carlo Miranda - General Manager of PRIVEE Magazine

Fiorella Añaños - Manager of La Naranja Media e Interacción Móvil

.

Background Music

Opening Show – West End & Sybil - "The Love I Lost"

Swimsuit Competition – Destination - Move On Up

Evening Gown Competition – Sarah Brightman & Steve Harley "The Phantom of the Opera"

References

External links
Official Site

Miss Peru
2010 in Peru
2010 beauty pageants